Willie Iverson (born October 8, 1945) is a retired professional basketball point guard who played one season in the American Basketball Association (ABA) as a member of the Miami Floridians during the 1968–69 season.

Born in Detroit, Michigan, he attended Central Michigan University where he played on their basketball team. Willie, has 4 kids and 5 grandchildren.  Willie taught 8th grade at East Bethlehem Lutheran School on Detroit's east side and was the basketball coach there.  He attended Pershing High School in Detroit where he made All-City and All-State Basketball player in 1964 and 1965.

References 
 American Basketball Association Players - Willie Iverson

External links
 

1945 births
Living people
American men's basketball players
Basketball players from Detroit
Central Michigan Chippewas men's basketball players
Miami Floridians players
Point guards
Pershing High School alumni

Pershing vs Northeastern Up in Arms Over A Rebound Willie Griffin, Willie Iverson and Roy Monroe